Angarrack railway viaduct crosses the valley of the Angarrack River at Angarrack in west Cornwall, United Kingdom.

Geography
The village extends up the valley and under the viaduct.

History
The original viaduct at Angarrack was designed by Isambard Kingdom Brunel for the West Cornwall Railway and was "... built wholly of timber on stone footings". The stone from the original Brunel footings was re-used to construct the sea wall on the approach to Penzance railway station. Today, no evidence remains of Brunel's original structure.

Building of the replacement commenced in January 1883 by Mr H Stevens of Ashburton, who also built the replacement viaducts at Redruth and Guildford (west of Angarrack). A tram-road of a few hundred yards was laid to a nearby quarry owned by Mr Gregor to provide infill for the granite viaduct. It is a Grade II listed building.

See also
 Angarrack railway station
 Cornwall Railway viaducts

References

Source

 

Bridges completed in 1885
Bridges by Isambard Kingdom Brunel
Grade II listed buildings in Cornwall
Industrial archaeological sites in Cornwall
Rail transport in Cornwall
Railway bridges in Cornwall
Railway viaducts in Cornwall
Hayle